Ivan Welles Decker (born November 8, 1985) is a Canadian comedian. He won the 2018 Juno Award for Comedy Album of the Year for his album I Wanted to Be a Dinosaur.

He has performed stand-up comedy across North America and on the CBC Radio One program The Debaters, the Winnipeg and Halifax Comedy festivals for CBC Television, the Just for Laughs festival in Montreal, and made his international TV debut on Conan. 

Ivan Decker also appeared as one of only 4 Canadians in the Netflix series, Comedians of the World which aired on January 1, 2019.

Decker was born in Montreal, Quebec, and grew up in Ladner, British Columbia.

Discography

References

External links 
 Official Website

Canadian stand-up comedians
Juno Award for Comedy Album of the Year winners
Living people
1985 births
21st-century Canadian comedians
Canadian male comedians
Comedians from Montreal
Comedians from British Columbia